Fwâi (Poai) is a Kanak language of New Caledonia, in the commune of Hienghène.

References

Bibliography
 

New Caledonian languages
Languages of New Caledonia
Vulnerable languages